Žerenk (in older sources also Žerenik) is a former settlement in the Municipality of Moravče in central Slovenia. It is now part of the village of Dešen. The area is part of the traditional region of Upper Carniola. The municipality is now included in the Central Slovenia Statistical Region.

Geography
Žerenk lies in the northwestern part the village of Dešen, below the west slope of Ribič Hill. It corresponds to the hamlet of Ribič.

History
Žerenk had a population of 15 living in two houses in 1900. Žerenk was annexed by Dešen in 1952, ending its existence as an independent settlement.

References

External links

Žerenk (labeled Ribič) on Geopedia

Populated places in the Municipality of Moravče
Former settlements in Slovenia